The Boy Who Cried Werewolf is a 2010 Nickelodeon made-for-television comedy horror film starring Victoria Justice, Chase Ellison, Matt Winston, Brooke D'Orsay, Steven Grayhm, and Brooke Shields. The screenplay was written by Art Edler Brown and Josh Nick. It was filmed in Vancouver, British Columbia, Canada.

Plot
Jordan Sands (Victoria Justice) is an awkward and nerdy 17-year-old girl with a bad case of allergies who became the woman of the house after the recent death of her mother. Her father David (Matt Winston) is struggling to make ends meet while her 14-year-old brother Hunter (Chase Ellison) drives the family crazy with gory pranks as he loves monsters. They inherit their mother's great uncle Dragomir Vukovic's castle in Wolfsberg, Romania, which they did not know existed. After arriving in Wolfsberg, they meet the strange and steely castle housekeeper, Madame Varcolac (Brooke Shields), whose name when pronounced causes a wolf to howl in the distance.

Meanwhile the kids explore the town, Hunter learns about the "Wolfsberg Beast", a monster that protects both the castle and the town and Jordan falls in love with the local butcher, Goran. Varcolac discourages David from selling the property, but he decides to so that they can put an end to their financial struggles. He goes on dates with the bubbly real estate agent Paulina von Eckberg, who handles the selling and only appears at night.

One day, while snooping around Dragomir's lab, Jordan accidentally steps on a vial of blood. Though Hunter pulls the bloody glass from her foot, her behavior changes, she becomes a carnivore, her senses heighten, and her allergies disappear. Hunter's friends explain that Jordan has become a werewolf due to either a bloodline curse, a werewolf bite, or becoming infected with the blood of a werewolf. Hunter realizes it was the vial of blood, which is revealed to have been LB-217, short for "Lycanthrope Blood".

Jordan transforms into a werewolf, which Hunter witnesses. She holds back from attacking Hunter and flees. Hunter's friends reveal that there is no cure they know of other than killing a werewolf with a silver bullet. Hunter refuses to do this. His friends warn that if Jordan is not cured by next sunrise, she will remain a werewolf, cursed to shift every night until the end of her life.

Hunter turns to Varcolac, who reveals that Dragomir was also a werewolf and was actually the famed "Wolfsberg Beast". Vampires attempted to take over the castle and rise to power but Dragomir stopped them before he was killed. Before his death, he had been working on a cure to lycanthropy. As Varcolac quickly gathers the ingredients for the cure, Paulina captures the siblings, revealing herself as a Vampire and the one who killed Dragomir. She wants to take over the manor but must kill Jordan first, as she is unable to take the castle as long as Dragomir's werewolf relatives are alive. Jordan, in her werewolf form, is restrained, while Hunter escapes and leads David to the hideout. However, they are also captured.

Before Paulina can shoot Jordan, Hunter suddenly turns into a werewolf himself; as he is part of the bloodline, making him a true descendant, unlike Jordan. The siblings fight the Vampires until the sun rises and the Vampires are killed in sunlight. Back at the manor, Hunter's blood is used in the antidote, and it successfully subdues Jordan's werewolf nature, making her half-human and half-werewolf. The Sands family formally receives the money they inherited from Dragomir, which turns out to be enough for them to both keep the castle and their original home as Dragomir had supposedly invented karaoke. Hunter becomes the Wolfsberg Beast, his true destiny, and takes Dragomir's place.

The family returns home, where Jordan demonstrates a new confidence at school. Goran also moves to California as a foreign exchange student and the two start a relationship. In a twist, it turns out that Paulina survived, and has moved to their neighborhood to continue her attempts at taking the castle.

The movie ends as the cast sings "...Baby One More Time" on karaoke.

Cast

Home media
The film was released on DVD on November 8, 2013, and on Blu-ray on December 4, 2015.

Reception
The movie received generally mixed reviews from critics for its plotline, though was generally praised for its sound effects. Felix Vasques Jr. of CinemaCrazed stated, "The Boy Who Cried Werewolf ends up being a surprisingly solid family horror comedy that isn't as soapy or girly as I originally assumed it would be. Within the pandering to preteens salivating after Justice, there is also a solid however flawed and derivative story and some wicked special effects."

Brian Lowry of Variety called the film inoffensive and cheap, finding little to recommend.

Nominations 
 Young Artist Award for Best Performance in a TV Movie, Miniseries or Special – Leading Young Actress – Victoria Justice (2011)

References

External links
 
 

2010 television films
2010 films
2010 comedy horror films
2010 fantasy films
2010 multilingual films
2010s American films
2010s Canadian films
2010s English-language films
2010s fantasy comedy films
2010s Romanian-language films
2010s teen comedy films
2010s teen fantasy films
2010s teen horror films
American comedy horror films
American comedy television films
American fantasy comedy films
American horror television films
American multilingual films
American teen comedy films
American teen horror films
American vampire films
American werewolf films
Canadian comedy horror films
Canadian comedy television films
Canadian fantasy comedy films
Canadian horror television films
Canadian multilingual films
Canadian teen comedy films
Canadian vampire films
Canadian werewolf films
Fantasy television films
Films about inheritances
Films directed by Eric Bross
Films set in castles
Films set in Romania
Films shot in Vancouver
Nickelodeon original films
Vampire comedy films